Lucas de Heere (1534 – 29 August 1584) was a Flemish painter, poet and writer. His costume books and portraits are a valuable resource in depicting 16th-century clothing.

Biography 

Lucas de Heere, a Protestant, was born in Ghent, the second son of Jean de Heere, a sculptor, and Anna Smijters, a miniaturist. He was trained by his father. He also studied in Antwerp under Flemish painter and draughtsman, Frans Floris. Upon his return to Ghent, he established a school of painting. One of his students was Karel van Mander. In 1565, he married Eleonore Carboniers.

He became a refugee from the Dutch Revolt against Philip II of Spain, who tried to suppress Protestantism. In 1568, De Heere went to France, where he was employed by Catherine de' Medici designing Gobelins tapestry. He then traveled to England, where he became an elder of the Dutch stranger church at Austin Friars. In 1570, he was employed by Edward Clinton, 1st Earl of Lincoln, to paint a gallery and depict the clothing and costumes of various nations. After the Pacification of Ghent in 1576, he was able to return home, if only for a while. He was once again forced to leave the city in 1584, when Ghent surrendered to Spanish Habsburg forces.

He was very popular during his career and became immensely rich. His portrait of Katheryn of Berain is held by the National Museum Cardiff. He painted a head of Philip II from the life in 1553, as a letter of Cardinal Granvelle documents; this is presumed to be the painting now in the Prado.

In 1559 he painted by order of the chancellor Viglius van Aytta Solomon and the Queen of Sheba, which was commissioned for the choir of St Bavo's Cathedral in Ghent before the celebration of the twenty-third chapter of the Order of the Golden Fleece, conserved in situ.

In England he trained other young Netherlanders: John de Critz, probably Marcus Gheeraerts the Younger, and possibly as well the English Robert Peake the Elder.

Some time between 1573 and 1575, working on-site, he painted Stonehenge; the sketch is now in the British Library, and is the earliest known realistic depiction of the site.

Publications 
While he was in exile, de Heere developed an interest for ethnography, history and geography. This became clear through his works such as Corte beschryvinghe van Engheland Schotland ende Irland (a description of England, Scotland and Ireland), the Corte beschryvinghe van D'engelandsche geschiedenissen (a description of the English history) and the Theatre de tous les peuples et nations de la terre (a manuscript displaying the different costumes people wore). This costume book is a very rare manuscript. It holds a special value for the collective memory because it displays the perception of historical and contemporary costumes of the 16th century. The manuscript has an extraordinary artistic value, since it consists of 98 paintings of this meritorious painter, Lucas de Heere. The important manuscript is preserved in the Ghent University Library.

Some of his other works are:
Beschrijvinghe van het ghene dat vertoocht wierdt ter incomste van dExcellentie des princen van Orangien binnen der stede van Ghendt [...], S.l.: s.n., 1578. Google Books
Pasquillus testament, ten zijn fablen noch droomen, deur den paus toegelaten ende ghedruct in Roomen, aen u Nederlants volck, ghesonden voor memorie, u over de Spaengiaerts wenschende eewige victorie, S.l.: s.n., 1579. Google Books
Den hof ende boomgaert der poësien, Haarlem: David Wachtendonck, 1614. Google Books.

See also 
 Artists of the Tudor court
 Cultural depictions of Philip II of Spain
 Valois Tapestries
 Ghent University Library

References

Further reading 
 
 Caecilie Weissert: Die kunstreichste Kunst der Künste: Lukas de Heere und Frans Floris. In: Die Kunstreichste Kunst der Künste. Niederländische Malerei im 16. Jahrhundert. Hirmer, 2011, ISBN 3-7774-3631-3, S. 156-158.

External links 

 CC-licensed High-Resolution scans at Ghent University Library
 

1534 births
1584 deaths
Flemish Renaissance painters
Artists from Ghent
Refugees in France
Flemish poets
Belgian expatriates in England